Classic Conway is a compilation album by American country music artist Conway Twitty. It was released in 1983 via MCA Records.

Track listing

Chart performance

References

1983 compilation albums
Conway Twitty albums
Albums produced by Owen Bradley
Albums produced by Ron Chancey
MCA Records compilation albums